Judy Rothman Rofé (born September 17, 1962) is an American screenwriter, producer, lyricist and author specializing in comedy and literary adaptations for children. She won the 2002 Emmy for Best Animated Program for The New Adventures of Madeline (based on the books by Ludwig Bemelmans), for which she was writer, lyricist, story editor and supervising producer on over 70 episodes. She was nominated for seven additional Emmys, and also won an Ace award and the Humanitas Prize.  In 2016 Rothman created the preschool television series Julie's Greenroom with Julie Andrews and Emma Walton Hamilton. The show stars Julie Andrews, who is joined by her assistant Gus (Giullian Yao Gioiello) and the “Greenies,” a cast of original puppets built by The Jim Henson Company and premiered on Netflix on March 17, 2017.

Rothman was a previously an executive at the Disney Channel and has written and developed dozens of series and specials, including Arthur (PBS), Angelina Ballerina (PBS), Rainbow Fish, "Big Bird Gets Lost", Bill and Ted's Excellent Adventures, Camp Candy, and the animated feature film Trumpet of the Swan. She and Alex Rockwell are currently showrunners and writers/executive producers/lyricists on Norman Picklestripes, a new 52-episode stop-motion comedy series in production at the Factory animation studio in Manchester, UK for Universal Kids, which was nominated for the 2020 Annie, Emmy, Kidscreen and Cynopsis awards.
 
Rothman's songs have been featured on many television programs and have been released on four Sony and Rhino CDs. She collaborated with Joe Raposo on the Madeline theme song and also wrote the lyrics for the theme song of the long-running Canadian series Mona the Vampire. She has worked on many songs with New York composer/songwriter/lyricist/pianist Jeffrey Zahn of JoJo's Circus, as well as with composer/pianist Andy Street on Madeline and Strawberry Shortcake. She was the head writer, lyricist and supervising producer with British composer/pianist Mark Sayer-Wade, composer/lyricist/songwriter/guitarist Mark Williamson, co-lyricist/songwriter Scott Erickson and songwriter Joseph K. Phillips of the PBS Kids computer-animated series Angelina Ballerina: The Next Steps and lyricist with Alex Rockwell for Jim Henson's Pajanimals and "Jim Henson's Word Party." Rothman is also developing a 2D series for the Ontario-based Nelvana.

Rothman has also gained fame as the formerly anonymous The Neurotic Parent author, essayist and anonymous blogger, whose satiric guide to college admissions was published using the name J.D. Rothman in March 2012 by Prospect Park Books.

A previous portion of the blog was published anonymously in I'm Going to College, Not You, edited by Jennifer Delahunty, the dean of admissions of Kenyon College. The book, a Los Angeles Times bestseller, based on the blog is titled The Neurotic Parent's Guide to College Admissions.

Screenwriting credits

Television
 Maxie’s World (1987)
 Fantastic Max (1988-1990)
 ALF Tales (1989)
 Camp Candy (1989)
 Bill & Ted’s Excellent Adventures (1991)
 Captain Zed and the Zee Zone (1991, 1993)
 Super Dave: Daredevil for Hire (1992)
 Madeline (1993-2001)
 The Puzzle Place (1995)
 Strawberry Shortcake (2003)
 ToddWorld (2004)
 Happy Monster Band (2007-2008)
 Angelina Ballerina: The Next Steps (2009)
 Word Party (2016)
 Julie's Greenroom (2017)
 Norman Picklestripes (2019–present)

Film
 Monster Mash (2000)
 The Trumpet of the Swan (2001)

References

External links

theneuroticparent.com blog

1962 births
Place of birth missing (living people)
Living people
American women screenwriters
American bloggers
Anonymous bloggers
American women bloggers
21st-century American screenwriters
21st-century American women writers